Pan de Cádiz  or turrón de Cádiz is a large marzipan confection from Cádiz, Spain. Pan means 'bread' in Spanish, a name which the dish probably acquired due to its appearance as a rectangular bread. There are many different recipes, but the basic ingredients are always marzipan and candied fruit. It was invented in the 1950s by the pastry chef Antonio Valls Garrido, who first sold the dish in his pastry shop Viena. The origins of the dish may lie in the marzipan rolls with fruit made in Cádiz during the nineteenth century. It is most often eaten during Christmas.

See also 
Turrón

References 

Andalusian cuisine
Christmas food
Spanish confectionery
Marzipan
Stuffed desserts